, son of regent Nijō Yoshimoto, was a Japanese kugyō (court noble) of the Muromachi period (1336–1573). He held a regent position kampaku three times from 1379 to 1382, from 1388 to 1394 and from 1398 to 1399. He was the father of Nijō Mitsumoto and Nijō Motonori.

References
 

1356 births
1400 deaths
Fujiwara clan
Morotsugu